"Do to Me" is a song by the British rock band Smokie from their 1979 studio album The Other Side of the Road. It was the album's first single.

Background and writing 
The song was written by Chris Norman and Smokie drummer Pete Spencer and produced by Smokie.

Commercial performance 
The song reached no. 10 in Germany.

Charts

References

External links 

 Smokie — "Do to Me" at Discogs

1979 songs
1979 singles
Smokie (band) songs
Songs written by Chris Norman
RAK Records singles